Kadathur block is a revenue block in the Dharmapuri district of Tamil Nadu, India. It has a total of 25 panchayat villages.

Panchayat Villages in Kadathur Block include:

References 

Dharmapuri district
Revenue blocks of Dharmapuri district